Rządza is a river of Poland. It flows into the Zegrze Reservoir, which is drained by the Narew, near Borki. The source zone of Rządza is located within the morainic Kałuszyn upland. The length of the river is approximately 66 km, and the size of the catchment area is 475.9 km2

References

Rivers of Poland
Rivers of Masovian Voivodeship